Jay Kerr (born November 16, 1948) is an American actor. A native of Del Rio, Texas, he was raised on a ranch, and raced horses, growing up. He has appeared in various movies and television series including his longest role as "Con Madigan" in the television series Five Mile Creek for three years.

Partial filmography
1st &Ten
Blossom
Dynasty 
Five Mile Creek (Disney Channel television series, as "Con Madigan")
Hard Country
The John Larroquette Show 
Wizards and Warriors

External links

Living people
American male film actors
American male television actors
Male actors from Texas
1948 births
People from Del Rio, Texas